"La Jumpa" (English: "The Jump") is a song by American rapper Arcángel and Puerto Rican rapper Bad Bunny, from the former's fifth studio album Sr. Santos (2022). It was originally released on November 30, 2022, by Rimas Entertainment. The song was written by Austin Santos and Benito Martínez and its production was held by MAG and Julia Lewis.

Chart performance 
"La Jumpa" debuted and peaked at number 68 on the US Billboard Hot 100 dated December 17, 2022. Additionally, it peaked at number 3 on the US Hot Latin Songs chart as well as peaking at number 8 on the Billboard Global 200.

Audio visualizer 
A visualizer for the song was uploaded to YouTube on November 30, 2022.

Music video 
The music video for "La Jumpa" was released on YouTube on February 2, 2023.

Charts

Certifications

References

External links 
 
 
 

2022 songs
2022 singles
Arcángel (singer) songs
Bad Bunny songs
Number-one singles in Spain
Songs written by Bad Bunny